Samantha Mathis (born May 12, 1970) is an American actress and trade union leader who served as the Vice President, Actors/Performers of SAG-AFTRA from 2015 to 2019. The daughter of actress Bibi Besch, Mathis made her film debut in Pump Up the Volume (1990), and later co-starred or appeared in such films as FernGully: The Last Rainforest (1992), Super Mario Bros. (1993), The Thing Called Love (1993), Little Women (1994), The American President (1995), Broken Arrow (1996), American Psycho (2000), The Punisher (2004), and Atlas Shrugged: Part II (2012). She has recently had recurring roles on The Strain as New York City Councilwoman Justine Feraldo, and on Billions as Taylor Mason Capital COO Sara Hammon.

Early life
Mathis was born in Williamsburg, Brooklyn, New York City, the daughter of Donald Mathis and Austrian-born actress Bibi Besch. Her parents divorced when she was two years old, and Mathis was brought up by her mother. She relocated with her mother to Los Angeles, California, at the age of five. 

Besch tried to discourage Mathis from pursuing acting, but growing up on locations, in theaters, and in acting classes, Mathis knew she wanted to act. She decided to become an actress at the age of twelve.

Career
Mathis began acting professionally at the age of 16. Her first job was a commercial for "Always Slender Pads – Just for Teens". She co-starred in the television series Aaron's Way and Knightwatch from 1988 to 1989. Her first starring role in a feature film was that of Nora in Pump Up the Volume (1990), opposite Christian Slater, whom she briefly dated at the time. Mathis dyed her natural blonde hair black for the role in an effort to change her image from sweet and innocent to strong-willed.

Mathis appeared in the television movies Extreme Close-up, 83 Hours 'til Dawn and To My Daughter in 1990. Mathis and Slater had voice roles in the animated film FernGully: The Last Rainforest (1992). She next appeared in the comedy This Is My Life (1992), written and directed by Nora Ephron, playing an insecure teenager. Mathis appeared in the play Fortinbras in New York City in October 1992. Super Mario Bros. (1993), in which she played Princess Daisy from the popular Nintendo video game, was a box-office bomb but gained a cult following since its release.

Mathis co-starred with River Phoenix in The Thing Called Love (1993). She appeared in the 1994 film adaptation of Little Women, and in How to Make an American Quilt (1995), both starring Winona Ryder. She then appeared in The American President (1995), playing the assistant to the President of the United States. Mathis costarred with Christian Slater again, along with  John Travolta, in John Woo's Broken Arrow (1996). She took a little over a year off from acting after her mother died in 1996 from breast cancer.

Mathis later appeared in American Psycho (2000), a film adaptation of Bret Easton Ellis's 1991 novel of the same name. She starred in Attraction (2000) and in The Simian Line (2001). She starred in the TNT television miniseries The Mists of Avalon (2001). Mathis starred with Thomas Jane in The Punisher (2004). She had a guest role on the ABC television show Lost as Olivia Goodspeed. She played Jane Fonda's daughter in  the Broadway show "33 Variations." Her indie film Lebanon, PA had its world premiere at the 2010 SXSW Film Festival. She appeared in an off-Broadway production of the play, Love, Loss, and What I Wore, at New York City's Westside Theatre in October 2011.

In 2013, Mathis played psychiatrist Alice Calvert on the CBS television series Under the Dome, based on a novel by Stephen King. In 2014, she joined the cast of the FX horror drama series The Strain as Justine Feraldo, a New York City councilwoman for Staten Island.

In October 2015, Mathias was elected National Vice President, Actors/Performers of SAG-AFTRA. She was re-elected in 2017.

In 2019, she appeared Off-Broadway in the role of Kate Conlee in Make Believe, a new play by Bess Wohl staged at the Second Stage Theater. Michael Greif directed.

Her 2020 musical Whisper House was postponed due to the COVID-19 pandemic.

Personal life
Mathis met actor River Phoenix on the set of the 1993 film The Thing Called Love. Soon thereafter, she broke up with boyfriend John Leguizamo and started a relationship with Phoenix. She was with Phoenix on October 31, 1993, the night he died at Cedars-Sinai Hospital of a drug overdose after collapsing outside The Viper Room in West Hollywood, California. 

In the autopsy report, the LASD detailed that Mathis refused several times to give more details surrounding the death of Phoenix and had told deputies at the time of Phoenix's death that she had no knowledge of his drug use. Mathis took a role in the film Jack and Sarah (1995), which was shot in London, to get out of the country after Phoenix's death because of the excessive press coverage.

Mathis spoke for the first time publicly about the death of Phoenix in an interview with The Guardian in 2018. She elaborated on the circumstances surrounding Phoenix's death: "I knew something was wrong that night, something I didn’t understand. I didn’t see anyone doing drugs but he was high in a way that made me feel uncomfortable...the heroin that killed him didn’t happen until he was in the Viper Room. I have my suspicions about what was going on, but I didn’t see anything."

Awards and nominations
 
Mathis was nominated in 1995 for a Young Artist Award, despite being 22 years old at the time of her role, at the Young Artist Awards for Best Young Actress Starring in a Motion Picture for This Is My Life (1992) and in 2005 for a Saturn Award by the Academy of Science Fiction, Fantasy & Horror Films for Best Supporting Actress on Television for Salem's Lot (2004).

Filmography

Film

Television

Notes

References

External links
 

1970 births
Actresses from Los Angeles
Actresses from New York City
American child actresses
American film actresses
American people of Austrian descent
American television actresses
American voice actresses
Living people
University High School (Los Angeles) alumni
20th-century American actresses
21st-century American actresses
People from Williamsburg, Brooklyn